Martin "Chip" Koons Edwards (June 21, 1938 – April 3, 2017) was an American politician from the state of Indiana. A Republican, he served in the Indiana Senate from 1968 to 1981. Edwards served as President pro tempore of the Indiana Senate from 1978 to 1980. He was a delegate to the Republican National Convention in 1976. He resigned from the State Senate in 1981. In 1982, he went on trial for charges that he accepted a bribe in exchange to push railroad legislation. He died on April 3, 2017.

References

External links

|-

|-

1938 births
2017 deaths
Republican Party Indiana state senators